Sunny Tan is a Hong Kong businessman and politician who has been one of the four executive deputy chairmen of the Federation of Hong Kong Industries.

Electoral history

References 

1973 births
Living people
Stanford University alumni
University of Wisconsin–Madison alumni
HK LegCo Members 2022–2025